The Chief of the Joint General Staff was the highest-ranking military officer of in the Republic of Vietnam Military Forces, who was responsible for maintaining the operational command of the military and its three major branches.

History
The position was established with the creation of the General Staff of the Vietnamese National Army, in 1952. Following Vietnam's independence from France in October 1955, the title was changed to Chief of the Joint General Staff.

List of commanders

Vietnamese National Army

Republic of Vietnam Military Forces

References

External links

Vietnam, South